Machine Age Voodoo is the third studio album by Australian industrial band SPK, released on 30 November 1984 by WEA Records. It was first released outside the United States until 1985 when it was released by Elektra Records. Produced by Graeme Revell, the album is a radical departure from the band's previous material, leaning more towards synth-pop and dance-rock, rather than industrial music. It is the band's first studio album to feature Sinan Leong as lead vocalist.

Two singles from Machine Age Voodoo were released, "Metal Dance" and "Junk Funk", of which the latter was later renamed to "Machine Age Voodoo" on the US release of the album.

Track listing

Credits and personnel
Credits adapted from the album's liner notes.

Personnel
 Graeme Revell – producer, arrangements, all instruments
 Sinan Leong – vocals
 Jeff Bartolomei – additional keyboards
 Mary Bradfield-Taylor – additional vocals
 Graham Jesse – saxophone
 James Kelly – guitar
 Sam McNally – additional keyboards
 Phil Scorgie – bass, keyboards

Production
 Christo Curtis – engineer
 Tony Taurins – mastering

Design
 Carol Friedman – art direction
 JoDee Stringham – design
 Nelson Leong – logo design
 Peter Ashworth – photography
 Comme des Garçons – clothes
 Judy Blame – jewelry
 Lynne Easton – make-up
 Miss Moss – photomontage
 Iain R. Webb – stylist

References

External links
 

1984 albums
SPK (band) albums
Elektra Records albums